Rashawn Rivaldo Scott (born 22 March 2003) is an English footballer who plays as a midfielder for  club Reading.

Club career
On 21 October 2021, Reading announced the signing of Scott to their Under-23 team until the end of the season.

Career statistics

References

2004 births
Living people
English footballers
Association football midfielders
Reading F.C. players